Andrew Harmon Cozzens (born August 3, 1968) is an American prelate of the Roman Catholic Church who has been serving as bishop of the Diocese of Crookston in Minnesota since 2021.  He previously served as an auxiliary bishop of the Archdiocese of Saint Paul and Minneapolis in Minnesota from 2013 to 2021.

Early life and education
Andrew Harmon Cozzens was born on August 3, 1968, in Denver, Colorado to Jack and Judy Cozzens. He graduated from Benedictine College in Atchison, Kansas, in 1991. During his time there, Cozzens helped found an anti-abortion student group and a charismatic prayer group. In 1990, Cozzens was arrested several times for blocking access to abortion facilities, spending ten days in jail. After serving as a missionary with NET Ministries in 1991 and 1992, Cozzens entered the Saint Paul Seminary School of Divinity.

Priest
Cozzens was ordained a priest of the Archdiocese of Saint Paul and Minneapolis by Archbishop Harry J. Flynn on May 31, 1996. He served as associate pastor at the Cathedral of Saint Paul Parish from 1997 to 2000 and then at Divine Mercy Parish in Fairbault, Minnesota, from 2000 until 2002. He earned an Licentiate of Sacred Theology from the Pontifical University of St. Thomas Aquinas (the Angelicum) in Rome in 2002 and began full-time doctoral studies the same year.

Cozzens earned his Doctorate of Sacred Theology in 2008 with a dissertation entitled Imago Vivens Iesu Christi Sponsi Ecclesiæ: The Priest as a Living Image of Jesus Christ, Bridegroom of the Church, through the Evangelical Counsels. From 2006 to 2013, Cozzens was an assistant professor of sacramental theology and director of liturgy at the Saint Paul Seminary.

Auxiliary bishop of Saint Paul and Minneapolis

Cozzens was appointed titular bishop of Bisica and as an auxiliary bishop for the Archdiocese of Saint Paul and Minneapolis on October 11, 2013, by Pope Francis. He was consecrated a bishop on December 9, 2013, by Archbishop John Nienstedt.

Cozzens was part of a team that investigated allegations of misconduct on the part of Archbishop Nienstedt. Cozzens later remarked on the investigation: "It was doomed to fail. We did not have enough objectivity or experience with such investigations. Nor did we have authority to act. Throughout our efforts, we did not know where we could turn for assistance, because there was no meaningful structure to address allegations against bishops."In response to the former Cardinal Theodore McCarrick scandal, Cozzens advocated for a national review board of both clerical and lay members to investigate allegations of misconduct against American bishops. From August to December 2018, he served as the interim rector for the Saint Paul Seminary School of Divinity.

At the June 2021 meeting of the United States Conference of Catholic Bishops, Cozzens, as chair of the Evangelization Committee, announced a nationwide Eucharistic Revival to begin in 2022.  He said that the revival would focus on small local units such as families. The organization would be in three levels: parish, diocesan, and the whole United States. He said that the goal is to foster new and existing devotion to the Eucharist.

Bishop of Crookston
On October 18, 2021, Pope Francis named Cozzens as bishop of the Diocese of Crookston, Minnesota. He was installed there on December 6, 2021.

See also

 Catholic Church hierarchy
 Catholic Church in the United States
 Historical list of the Catholic bishops of the United States
 List of Catholic bishops of the United States
 Lists of patriarchs, archbishops, and bishops

References

External links
Roman Catholic Diocese of Crookston Official Site 
Roman Catholic Archdiocese of Saint Paul and Minneapolis Official Site
Catholic-Hierarchy

 

21st-century Roman Catholic bishops in the United States
1968 births
Living people
People from Denver
Pontifical University of Saint Thomas Aquinas alumni
Roman Catholic Archdiocese of Saint Paul and Minneapolis
Religious leaders from Minnesota
Catholics from Colorado
Bishops appointed by Pope Francis